Eddie or Edward Pearce may refer to:

 Eddie Pearce (born 1952), American golfer 
 Edward Pearce (businessman) (1862–1928), Chairman of the Shanghai Municipal Council
 Edward Pearce (journalist) (1939–2018), English political journalist and writer
 Edward Pearce (politician) (1833–1922), New Zealand businessman
 Edward Pearce, Baron Pearce (1901–1990), British judge
 Edward Lovett Pearce (1699–1733), Irish architect
 Edward Pearce (British Army officer), British Army general, father of Edward Lovett Pearce

See also
Edward Pierce (disambiguation)

es:Edward Pearce